Churchill's Leopards is a 1970 Italian-Spanish "macaroni combat" war film directed by Maurizio Pradeaux and starring Richard Harrison and Klaus Kinski.

Plot
A British commando team heads into occupied France to blow up a German held dam in preparation for D-Day, while a British officer infiltrates the German garrison, posing as his recently dead German twin brother, in order to provide help from the inside. The German commander is, however, becoming very suspicious.

Main cast
 Richard Harrison as Lt. Richard Benson / Lt. Hans Müller
 Pilar Velázquez as Elise
 Giacomo Rossi-Stuart as Major Powell
 Frank Braña as François Leduc
 Helga Liné as Marlene Schulman
 Antonio Casas as "La Tulipe"
 Klaus Kinski as Hauptsturmführer Holtz
 Herb Andress

See also
 Euro War
 War Film

References

External links

1970 films
Italian war films
Spanish war films
1970s Italian-language films
Western Front of World War II films
Macaroni Combat films
Films directed by Maurizio Pradeaux
Films produced by Ricardo Sanz
1970s Italian films
World War II films based on actual events